Maksym Mykolayovych Babiychuk (born 28 April 1994) is a Ukrainian professional footballer who plays as a goalkeeper for Kramatorsk.

Career
Babiychuk is a product of the Metalurh Zaporizhzhia Youth Sportive School System. His first trainer was Mykola Pozdobudko.

He made his debut for Metalurh Zaporizhzhia in the Ukrainian Premier League in a match against FC Karpaty Lviv on 31 October 2015.

He was called up to the Ukraine national under-20 football team in October 2014, but not spent any match for this representation.

References

External links 
 
 

1994 births
Living people
Footballers from Zaporizhzhia
Ukrainian footballers
Association football goalkeepers
FC Metalurh-2 Zaporizhzhia players
FC Metalurh Zaporizhzhia players
FC Bukovyna Chernivtsi players
FC Nyva Vinnytsia players
NK Veres Rivne players
FC Kramatorsk players
Ukrainian Premier League players
Ukrainian First League players
Ukrainian Second League players
21st-century Ukrainian people